Scopula calcarata is a moth of the family Geometridae described by David Stephen Fletcher in 1958. It is found in Malawi, Uganda and Cameroon.

References

Moths described in 1958
calcarata
Moths of Africa